Josue Soto (born January 3, 1989) is an American professional soccer player who plays as a midfielder for USL League One club Tormenta FC.

Career

Academy
Soto trained with the Houston Dynamo first team in the summers of 2008 and 2010, but he missed 2009 due to injury. He led the Dynamo Academy to the final of 2007 Dallas Cup, where the team lost in a penalty shootout. Soto was the second player to sign with the Dynamo Academy in its first month of existence, and he was announced on January 29, 2007, as one of two permitted players not residing in Dynamo's home territory. He stayed with his brother in Houston while training and competing with the Academy.

College and amateur
Soto split his collegiate career between Campbell in 2007-08 and Southern Methodist University in 2009-10. 

In 2007, Soto helped Campbell win Atlantic Sun Conference Tournament and advance to the NCAA tournament as a true freshman. He was named Atlantic Sun Conference Freshman of the Year, first team all-Atlantic Sun, and to Atlantic Sun all-freshman team. Soto was also named to all-South region third team by NSCAA and a second team freshman all-America by College Soccer News. He started all 22 games and notched eight goals and six assists, ranking in top five in conference in six different categories. Soto earned MVP honors at the Richmond Challenge Cup. He also scored opening penalty kick in 5-4 championship game shootout win over Jacksonville after 1-1 tie. Soto led Campbell with five of 12 shots in 2-0 NCAA tournament loss at No. 20 ranked Furman. 

In 2008, he led Campbell and the Atlantic Sun Conference with 11 assists in 18 games. He ranked fourth nationally with 0.61 assists per game. Soto scored a goal and added two assists against Belmont in the Atlantic Sun semifinals, Campbell's school-record 12th consecutive win. He scored a penalty kick goal and had two assists in Atlantic Sun Conference championship game against Jacksonville, but Campbell fell to a 4-3 defeat and failed to make the NCAA tournament.

The following year, he overcame pre-season injury to appear in 14 games with two goals and three assists in his first season at SMU after transferring from Campbell. 

In 2010, Soto was named a second team NSCAA all-Midwest region and second team all-Conference USA while leading SMU to NCAA quarterfinals. He led Mustangs with seven assists and scored seven goals, including a team-high four game-winners. Soto scored opening penalty kick in shootout win against Creighton in NCAA tournament second round. He had a shot from the top of the penalty area in the 11th minute to give SMU a 1-0 win over William & Mary in the third round. However, the Mustangs lost to No. 4 nationally ranked seed North Carolina in shootout in the NCAA quarterfinals.

Soto also played for Carolina Dynamo in the USL Premier Development League.

Professional
On January 19, 2011, Soto signed with Houston Dynamo as the club's third homegrown player. As a rookie, Soto did not appear in a competitive match. In the US Open Cup, he did not appear either. He made his first professional appearance with first team as a substitute in 2-0 Dynamo Charities Cup loss vs. Bolton Wanderers on July 20, 2011. He also came on as a substitute in a 3-0 friendly win on September 4 against Monterrey, the club he grew up cheering for.  As a reserve, he was one of two players to start all 10 matches for Dynamo Reserves, mostly in midfield but also at left back, contributing two assists. Soto had both assists with pinpoint delivery in 3-2 loss against FC Dallas on May 29, 2011.

On April 5, 2012, Soto joined NASL club San Antonio Scorpions on a month-long loan.  Two days later, he made his professional debut in the club's inaugural match against the Atlanta Silverbacks which ended in a 0-0 draw. Soto was released in early 2013 by Houston.

On February 27, 2013, Chivas USA announced that Soto and Emilio Orozco had joined the club after impressing during a pre-season trial. He was released following the season.

Soto signed with NASL side San Antonio Scorpions on March 20, 2014. He re-signed with the club on January 9, 2015. San Antonio ceased operations in December 2015.

International
He is a former United States youth international player. Soto attended United States under-18 national team camp in Carson, California.

Statistics

Personal
Soto was born in Fort Worth, but moved to Monterrey, Mexico, at the age of one. His parents are Rogelio and Ruth Soto, and he has a brother named Daniel, a sister-in-law called Veronica and niece named Isabella and nephews named Lucas and Samuel who live in Katy, Texas. Soto led Prepa Tec Monterrey to the 2005 private high school championship in Mexico. He has played with the ODP South Texas State hand Region III teams since 2005. Soto was named MVP of the 2005 Lone Star Showcase while playing with the Region III ODP squad.

References

External links
 
 
 
 

1989 births
Living people
American soccer players
Association football midfielders
North Carolina Fusion U23 players
Chivas USA players
Houston Dynamo FC players
Major League Soccer players
North American Soccer League players
San Antonio Scorpions players
SMU Mustangs men's soccer players
Soccer players from Texas
Sportspeople from Fort Worth, Texas
USL League Two players
Chattanooga Red Wolves SC players
USL League One players
FF Jaro players
AC Oulu players
Expatriate footballers in Finland
American expatriate sportspeople in Finland
American expatriate soccer players
Campbell Fighting Camels soccer players
Homegrown Players (MLS)
Rio Grande Valley FC Toros players
Tormenta FC players